Lauzanne Cove is a cove  wide, lying immediately south of the Guyou Islands on the south side of Flandres Bay, along the northeast coast of Kyiv Peninsula, Graham Land, Antarctica. It was first charted by the French Antarctic Expedition, 1903–05, under Jean-Baptiste Charcot, who named it for Stephane Lauzanne, the chief editor of the French newspaper Le Matin, 1900–15.

References

 SCAR Composite Gazetteer of Antarctica.

Coves of Graham Land
Danco Coast